Raggsteinnuten  is a mountain of Buskerud, in southern Norway. It is 1933 meters high.

Mountains of Viken